Talwandi Sabo Assembly constituency (Sl. No.: 94) is a Punjab Legislative Assembly constituency in Bathinda district, Punjab state, India.

Members of Legislative Assembly

Election Results

2022
:

2017 
:

See also
 List of constituencies of the Punjab Legislative Assembly
 Bathinda district

References

External links
  

Assembly constituencies of Punjab, India
Bathinda district